Shelton Township is an inactive township in Knox County, in the U.S. state of Missouri.

Shelton Township was established in 1845, taking its name from Medley Shelton, a pioneer judge.

References

Townships in Missouri
Townships in Knox County, Missouri